Oceana County is a county located in the U.S. state of Michigan. As of the 2020 Census, the population was 26,659. The county seat is Hart. Long known as part of the large Ojibwe territory, the county was founded by European Americans in 1840 and organized in 1855.

Settlers were attracted by access along the White River, which reaches its mouth on Lake Michigan in Muskegon County to the south. Two possibilities have been put forward to explain the county's name: Oceana County may have been named for Lake Michigan, a freshwater "ocean," which forms its western border; or it was named for the book Oceana, written by English author James Harrington in 1656.

Oceana County is famous as the "Asparagus Capital of the World" for its high production of asparagus. The annual Asparagus Festival includes a parade and crowning of the Asparagus Queen.

History
In the 1850s about 1400 Odawa were relocated here from Ionia County, Michigan by the federal government.

The county economy was first built on the lumber trade, with logs floated downriver. It later was developed for agriculture. In the 21st century, it is known for its commodity crop of asparagus.

Geography
The county is considered to be part of West Michigan. The county's western border is formed by Lake Michigan.

Adjacent counties
By land
 Mason County – north
 Lake County – northeast
 Newaygo County – east
 Muskegon County – south
By water
 Ozaukee County, Wisconsin – southwest
 Sheboygan County, Wisconsin – west

National protected area
 Manistee National Forest (part)

Major highways
  is the main route for Oceana County. The freeway runs north–south through the western part of county. It passes Pentwater, Hart, Shelby, Rothbury.
  are two business routes in Oceana County; one of the versions is a business loop that runs west of US 31 through Pentwater, while the other version is a business spur running through Hart.
  is a highway that runs east–west through the southern part of Oceana County. It enters east line at Hesperia, runs west to terminate at US 31 west of New Era.
  is a highway that runs along the eastern Oceana County line, from the county tri-point with Muskegon, Newaygo, and Oceana counties to an intersection with M-20 at Hesperia.

County designated highways

Demographics

This rural county reached a peak of population in 2000. It has attracted Hispanic or Latino immigrants who mostly work as farm laborers; in 2010 nearly 14% of the population was Hispanic.

The 2010 United States Census indicates Oceana County had a 2010 population of 26,570. This decrease of 303 people from the 2000 United States Census represents a 1.1% population decrease in the decade. In 2010 there were 10,174 households and 7,239 families in the county. The population density was 51.9 per square mile (20.0 square kilometers). There were 15,944 housing units at an average density of 31.1 per square mile (12.0 square kilometers). The racial and ethnic makeup of the county was 83.7% White, 0.4% Black or African American, 0.8% Native American, 0.2% Asian, 13.7% Hispanic or Latino, 0.1% from other races, and 1.2% from two or more races.

There were 10,174 households, out of which 30.4% had children under the age of 18 living with them, 56.6% were husband and wife families, 9.5% had a female householder with no husband present, 28.8% were non-families, and 24.6% were made up of individuals. The average household size was 2.58 and the average family size was 3.04.

The county population contained 24.9% under age of 18, 7.5% from 18 to 24, 21.5% from 25 to 44, 29.0% from 45 to 64, and 17.0% who were 65 years of age or older. The median age was 42 years. For every 100 females there were 100.9 males. For every 100 females age 18 and over, there were 99.3 males.

The 2010 American Community Survey 3-year estimate indicates the median income for a household in the county was $39,043 and the median income for a family was $46,816. Males had a median income of $21,774 versus $14,186 for females. The per capita income for the county was $18,065. About 1.9% of families and 19.0% of the population were below the poverty line, including 30.4% of those under the age 18 and 11.3% of those age 65 or over.

Religion
 Oceana County is part of the Roman Catholic Diocese of Grand Rapids.
 Oceana County is part of the Episcopal Diocese of Western Michigan.
 Several Christian denominations are represented in the county population.
 There is one meetinghouse of the Church of Jesus Christ of Latter-day Saints in Oceana County as of 2018.

Tourism
The Electric Forest Festival (formerly the Rothbury Music Festival) has been held annually in Rothbury, Michigan since 2008, except 2020 and 2021, due to COVID.

Camping is a popular summer activity in Oceana County. Areas on the lakeshore such as Silver Lake, Pentwater, and Stony Lake are popular tourist sites.

Government
Oceana County has largely voted Republican through the years. Since 1884 its voters have selected the Republican Party nominee in 82% (28 of 35) of the national elections through 2020.

Oceana County operates the County jail, maintains rural roads, operates the major local courts, records deeds, mortgages, and vital records, administers public health regulations, and participates with the state in the provision of social services. The county board of commissioners controls the budget and has limited authority to make laws or ordinances. In Michigan, most local government functions – police and fire, building and zoning, tax assessment, street maintenance etc. – are the responsibility of individual cities and townships.

Elected officials

 Prosecuting Attorney: Joseph J. Bizon
 Sheriff: Craig Mast
 County administrator: Robert J. Sobie, Ph.D.
 Animal Control: Michael Garcia
 Building Inspector: Randy Miller
 County Clerk: Amy L. Anderson
 Drain Commissioner: Michelle Martin
 Economic Alliance: Ms. Jodi Nichols
 Emergency Management: James C. Duram
 Equalization: Edward K. VanderVries, MMAO IV, PPE
 Medical Examiner: Dr. Rudy Ochs DO
 Register of Deeds: Richard A. Hodges
 County Treasurer: Mary Lou Phillips

(information as of May 2021)

Education
Public schools in Oceana County:
 Hart Public Schools
 Pentwater Public Schools
 Shelby Public Schools
 Walkerville Public Schools

Private schools in Oceana County:
 New Era Christian School
 Oceana Christian School

Communities

City
 Hart (county seat)

Villages
 Hesperia (partially)
 New Era
 Pentwater
 Rothbury
 Shelby
 Walkerville

Unincorporated communities

 Bird
 Collinsville
 Corbin's Mill (early seat of Oceana County, beginning 1865)
 Cranston
 Crystal Valley
 Elmwood
 Elwood
 Flower Creek
 Forest City
 Gale
 Mears
 Stony Lake

Townships

 Benona Township
 Claybanks Township
 Colfax Township
 Crystal Township
 Elbridge Township
 Ferry Township
 Golden Township
 Grant Township
 Greenwood Township
 Hart Township
 Leavitt Township
 Newfield Township
 Otto Township
 Pentwater Township
 Shelby Township
 Weare Township

See also
 List of Michigan State Historic Sites in Oceana County, Michigan
 National Register of Historic Places listings in Oceana County

References

Notes

Sources

External links
 Oceana County government

 
Michigan counties
1855 establishments in Michigan
Populated places established in 1855